The 1986 San Salvador earthquake occurred at  on 10 October 1986 with a moment magnitude of 5.7 and a maximum Mercalli intensity of IX (Violent). The shock caused considerable damage to El Salvador's capital city of San Salvador and surrounding areas, including neighboring Honduras and Guatemala.

Earthquake

The 1986 San Salvador earthquake occurred within the upper crust of the Caribbean Plate along the Central American volcanic chain. It was a result of left-lateral strike slip faulting perpendicular to the Central American volcanic chain. The earthquake also caused landslides located in the San Salvador area.

Damage and response
The earthquake caused between 1,000 and 1,500 deaths, 10,000 injuries, and left 200,000 homeless. Shallow shocks directly under San Salvador caused the destruction of multiple structures. San Salvador's children's hospital, a marketplace, many restaurants and buildings, and shanty towns were significantly damaged or destroyed.

In response, President José Napoleón Duarte established the Earthquake Reconstruction Committee tasked not only with rebuilding but also with modernizing El Salvador's capital. To lead the committee, Duarte tapped noted international urban planner and architect Jesús Permuy, who Duarte also asked to remain for another year to train Salvadoran officials on modern urban planning methods and principles following the conclusion of the Reconstruction Committee.

See also 
 List of earthquakes in El Salvador
 1965 San Salvador earthquake

References

Further reading

External links
 October 1986 San Salvador, El Salvador Images – National Geophysical Data Center
 

1986 earthquakes
Earthquakes in El Salvador
1986 in El Salvador
October 1986 events in North America